Pierre Billaud (21 May 1970 – 11 November 2001) was a French radio reporter and journalist. He started his career on Radio France then joined Radio Tele Luxembourg as international reporter. He covered the conflicts of Algeria, Israel, Palestine, Bosnia-Herzegovina and Kosovo. Billaud devoted various reports to the situation of the children and the women in Afghanistan.

Death
Billaud, along with fellow French journalist Johanne Sutton and German journalist Volker Handloik, was killed in an ambush in Dasht-e Qaleh, Takhar Province, Afghanistan on 11 November 2001. The trio were traveling on a Northern Alliance armoured personnel carrier when they came under attack by Taliban troops with machine guns and a rocket-propelled grenade launcher. Australian journalist Paul McGeough and French journalist Véronique Reyberotte survived the attack. According to Reyberotte, Billaud and Sutton jumped off the tank. Former French president Jacques Chirac and former French Prime Minister Lionel Jospin praised Sutton and Billaud for their courage.

See also
 List of journalists killed during the War in Afghanistan (2001–2021)

References

People from Agen
1970 births
2001 deaths
French war correspondents
Journalists killed while covering the War in Afghanistan (2001–2021)
French male non-fiction writers
20th-century French journalists
20th-century French male writers